Humphrey Osmond Hicks (20 May 1904 - 9 June 1986) was a croquet player from England.

Hicks won the President's Cup six times (1930, 1947, 1948, 1951, 1954 and 1961), the Open Championship seven times (1932 1939, 1947, 1948, 1949, 1950 and 1952) and the Men's Championship nine times (1930, 1932, 1948, 1949, 1950, 1955, 1956, 1961 and 1966).

Hicks represented England in three MacRobertson Shield tournaments, winning on two occasions.

In 2008 Hicks was inducted into the World Croquet Federation Hall of Fame.

References

External links
The Croquet Records site

1904 births
1986 deaths
English croquet players